Jezzine ( Jizzīn) is a town in Lebanon, located  from Sidon and  south of Beirut. It is the capital of Jezzine District.  Surrounded by mountain peaks, pine forests (like the Bkassine Pine Forest), and at an average altitude of 950 m (3,117 ft), it is the main summer resort and tourist destination of South Lebanon. The town is also well-known in Lebanon for its production of handmade, traditional cutlery and daggers with decorative inlays, artisanal wine, and the shrine of Our Lady of the Waterfall.

Demography

The inhabitants of Jezzine are mainly Maronite and Melkite Christians. The town is located on the slopes of Tumat Niha and is surrounded with pine forests, vineyards and orchards. From the top of the huge rocky promontory known as al Shir, the visitor enjoys a panoramic view of the surrounding localities scattered in the midst of a fertile plain and protected by mountains.

Culture

Festivals
The Feast of the Assumption of the Virgin Mary is celebrated on August 15 of each year with grand religious and cultural festivities. The Jezzine Summer Festival also attracts music acts and hundreds of people and tourists each summer.

Libraries
The Jezzine Public Library was built in 1960 and underwent refurbishment and reorganization in 2004.

Theatres
Empire Jezzine, the local movie theatre, plays Hollywood and Lebanese films. (Permanently closed)

Economy

Agriculture
The production of pine nuts is the main agriculture product of Bkassine, the neighbor of Jezzine, as this village has the largest pine field in the Middle East.

Handcrafts

Jezzine is known for its handcrafted knives and other cutlery, made of inlaid mosaics and bone. The cutlery has been presented as gifts to dignitaries all over the world as a memento of Lebanon. The first family who produced this cutlery is the el Haddad family and started the company in 1770. The latest was Samir Haddad, who died 28 January 2015 at the age of 84. He was praised for his skills and art by many people.

Tourism
Jezzine is a summer resort in South Lebanon. Its landscape features pine-forested valleys and mountain summits, ponds, and waterfalls. The town is known as the “City of Falls” because of its waterfalls, the Jezzine Falls.

Emigration
Like most towns on Mount Lebanon, Jezzine has a large and successful diaspora, especially in Latin America and West Africa.  For example the Aziz and Slim families have built sizeable businesses in Mexico, as well as the Karam and Wehbe families in West Africa

Attractions

At the entrance of Jezzine, there is "Saydet Jezzine" or "Saydet el-Maabour" (Our Lady of Jezzine) shrine; inside it lies the statue of the Virgin. In 1898, a passageway connecting Jezzine with the coastal cities and Sidon was built. In 1955, the Virgin Statue was erected during religions celebrations that occur on August 15, the day of the Virgin's Assumption. On this occasion, the celebrators go around the town till they reach the Virgin's Statue amidst prayers and lit candles.
 
The town overlooks a cliff of 40 meters high. At its sides, there are café houses and restaurants overlooking the landscape of Wadi Jezzine, which in turn overlooks green fields. In the center of the town there is the Municipal Palace, which was built according to the Ottoman style in 1898 during the reign of Sultan Abd el Hamid and the "Qaim Maqam" of the district, Saleem Bey Aammoun, at the expense of the municipality.
 
In Jezzine, there are churches that were built more than 200 years ago.
 
On the outskirts of the town is St. Maroun Church, which dates back to the 18th century. It was partially destroyed in 1759, and then repaired several times. It is distinguished for its vastness and elevated vaults. Visitors can reach the church via an old flight of stairs from the Old Section of the town.

The churches in Jezzine are:
 
Saydet el-Yanbou' Church (built in 1796): It includes a valuable icon of the Virgin and her Baby, Jesus (painted by the Italian artist "Piarotti"). It is placed on a vaulted marble altar. There are huge columns that support the walls lined with argillaceous and leaden (dull gray) stones.
St. Anthony Church (built in the 19th century): it has a central chapel beside which there are two other chapels. It includes 14 lit niches that represent the stages of the Cross Pathway, as well as engravings in the walls which surround the altar.
St. Joseph Church (built in 1860): its architecture and vaults have no central columns, and is divided into two parts: The first (for men) is higher than the other part (for women).
 
South of Jezzine lays Sirhal Palace, a huge building whose architecture is nontraditional. It was built by Dr. Farid Sirhal. The Palace includes spacious rooms topped with perforated glass colored vaults, as well as shapes of engraved water-springs. It is visible from the Ain Majdalein road, but is not open for visitors.

Karam Wines, Southern Lebanon's only winery, owns land in the area where they primarily grow Syrah and Cabernet Sauvignon.

History

The name, Jezzine, derives from the Aramaic (Syriac) word, meaning "depot" or "store". Many historians believe that Jezzine served as a storing location for traders because of its strategic location on the caravan route that connected the ancient port city of Sidon to the Chouf, the Beqaa Valley, and to Syria.

The Australian 7th Division, with British and Free French forces, supported by the Royal Australian Air Force, Royal Australian Navy, Royal Navy and Royal Air Force, fought for Jezzine against Vichy French forces in 1941.

Julián Slim Haddad (born Khalil Salim Haddad Aglamaz), was born in 1888 in Jezzine. He emigrated to Mexico when he was 14 years old to avoid being conscripted into the Army of the Ottoman Empire. After moving to Mexico City, Julián established a dry goods store, La Estrella de Oriente (The Star of the Orient). One of his sons, Carlos Slim Helú, born on 28 January 1940 in Mexico City, inherited his father's business talent and ultimately became the richest man in the world in 2007.

Following the 1982 invasion of Lebanon Jezzine became part of the Israeli ‘security zone’. On 6 June 1992 two members of the South Lebanon Army (SLA) were killed by a roadside bomb near Jezzine.
On 24 August 1995 fighting in Jezzine between the SLA and Hizbollah resulted in two Hizbollah fighters being killed. The following day an IDF patrol in the area killed three more Hizbollah men.

Technically Jezzine was not part of the security zone but the town was the base for a South Lebanon Army (SLA) unit calling itself the 20th Battalion. The Israeli backed unit controlled five neighbouring villages. In the spring of 1997 Hizbollah launched a five-month campaign attempting to cut off the SLA in Jezzine from the IDF and the other SLA forces further south. On 18 June two SLA soldiers and an officer, as well as one civilian, were killed by a roadside bomb. In the aftermath the IDF detained a number of youths in the town and SLA commander-in-chief Antoine Lahad visited and made threats of “unspecified violence” if attacks continued. The following month, 17 July, the Israeli head of Northern Command, Major General Amiram Levin visited the town in attempt to bolster SLA morale. On 18 August a roadside bomb killed two teenage children of a local SLA commander who had been killed four years earlier. The SLA responded with indiscriminate shelling of Sidon which killed seven civilians and wounded thirty-five. Earlier the same month local notables, backed by Dany Chamoun called on the government to move the Lebanese army into Jezzine, without success. On 29 November two SLA members were killed by a roadside bomb outside Jezzine.

In October 1998 it was reported that the population of Jezzine had fallen from 50,000 to around 3,000.

On 1 June 1999 the South Lebanon Army began dismantling its TV station and headquarters in Jezzine. In the following two weeks they withdrew from the town and thirty six surrounding villages. Retreating SLA members and their families commandeered empty houses in Marjayun, Ibl al-Saqi and Kawkaba in the Indian UNIFIL zone. At the time it was estimated that the SLA had only four hundred men.

Landmarks
Jezzine's Waterfalls, some as high as 90 m (295 ft)
Our Lady of the Waterfall, a Marian shrine
The 400-year-old Kanaan Family Palace
The Farid Serhal Palace
The Chir cliff has views of the forested mountains and one of Jezzine's waterfalls that drops 90 m over the cliff. 
The Grotto of Fakhreddin II

 Joseph Azar (singer)
 Raymond Azar,  the head of the Lebanese military intelligence.
 Jean Aziz (1917), Minister of Labour and Social Affairs (1961), Minister of Media and Planning (1968), Minister of Communication and Public Works. Also a known poet and lawyer.
Darine Chahine,  talk show host 
 Ounsi el-Hajj (1937-2014), Poet, Journalist, Translator
 Sleiman Hajjar,  the Melkite Catholic bishop of Canada.
 Damianos Kattar, former Minister of Finance
 Karen Maron (1979), journalist, war correspondent, producer, international analyst and writer
Paul Peter Meouchi (1894), 74th Maronite Patriarch of Antioch from 1955 until his death in 1975 and a cardinal of the Catholic Church
 Gabrielle Bou Rached (1985), Miss Lebanon
 Edmond Rizk (1934), MP (1968-1992), Minister of Education (1973), Minister of Justice (1989), previous member of the Kataeb Party politburo.
Carlos Slim (1940), Mexican business magnate, investor and philanthropist

References

External links
Jezzine - Ain Majdalayne, Localiban
Jezzine On Google Maps Street View By Paul Saad

Christian communities in Lebanon
Populated places in the Israeli security zone 1985–2000
Maronite Christian communities in Lebanon
Melkite Christian communities in Lebanon
Populated places in Jezzine District
Jezzine, Lebanon, Our Lady of the Waterfall